Montagu Island is the largest of the South Sandwich Islands, located in the Scotia Sea off the coast of Antarctica. It is a part of the British Overseas Territory, South Georgia and the South Sandwich Islands.

The island was first sighted by James Cook in 1775, and named after John Montagu, 4th Earl of Sandwich and the First Lord of the British Admiralty at the time of its discovery. The first recorded landing was made by the Norwegian whaler and explorer Carl Anton Larsen in 1908.

Geography
It was believed to be inactive prior to the sighting of low-level ash emission and suspected lava effusion in 2002 by the British Antarctic Survey.

Mount Belinda
In November 2005, satellite images revealed that an eruption of Mount Belinda had created a  molten river flowing to the northern shoreline of the island.

, imaging on Google Earth shows the volcano to be active with a noticeable plume and lava flow.  The effects on the ice sheet are visible.

Gallery

Features 
 Horsburgh Point, on the southwest side of Montagu Island
 Hueca Point, the westernmost point of Montagu Island
 Leeson Point, the northeast corner of Montagu Island
 Mount Oceanite, in the extreme southeast corner of Montagu Island

See also 
 List of Antarctic and sub-Antarctic islands

References

Sources
 
 First recorded eruption of Mount Belinda volcano (Montagu Island), South Sandwich Islands, Bull Volcanol (2005) 67:415–422 (PDF)

External links
 at Oceandots.com

Islands of the South Sandwich Islands
Volcanoes of the Atlantic Ocean
Volcanoes of South Georgia and the South Sandwich Islands
Uninhabited islands of South Georgia and the South Sandwich Islands